Rosi Speiser (born 24 November 1951, in Bolsterlang) is a German former alpine skier who competed in the 1972 Winter Olympics. She finished fifth in the slalom event.

References

External links
 sports-reference.com

1951 births
Living people
People from Oberallgäu
Sportspeople from Swabia (Bavaria)
Olympic alpine skiers of West Germany
Alpine skiers at the 1972 Winter Olympics
German female alpine skiers